SS Abigail Gibbons was a Liberty ship built in the United States during World War II. She was named after Abigail Gibbons, an abolitionist and co-founder of the Women's Prison Association.

Construction
Abigail Gibbons was laid down on 1 September 1944, under a Maritime Commission (MARCOM) contract, MC hull 2379, by J.A. Jones Construction, Brunswick, Georgia; she was sponsored by Mrs. W. Franklin Brown, daughter of Edwin L. Jones,  and launched on 12 October 1944.

History
She was allocated to American Foreign Steamship Corporation, on 25 October 1944. On 30 September 1949, she was laid up in the National Defense Reserve Fleet, in Mobile, Alabama. On 7 September 1971, she was sold for $35,424.54 to Union Minerals & Alloys Co., to be scrapped. She was removed from the fleet on 20 September 1971.

References

Bibliography

 
 
 
 
 

 

Liberty ships
Ships built in Brunswick, Georgia
1944 ships
Mobile Reserve Fleet